"Voyeur" is a song by American singer-songwriter Kim Carnes from her seventh studio album of the same name (1982). Written by Carnes, her husband Dave Ellingson, and Duane Hitchings, the song is an uptempo synth-pop track. It is the first track from the album, and its lead single.

Billboard called it "a rocking synthesized track which is as immediately striking as 'Bette Davis Eyes.'"

"Voyeur" peaked at number 25 on Cash Boxs Top 100 Singles and number 29 on the Billboard Hot 100. Internationally, the single reached number five in Norway and number 10 in Spain and Sweden. It featured a then-controversial music video, which was later banned for its suggestiveness. The song received a nomination for Best Female Rock Vocal Performance at the 1983 Grammy Awards.

Track listings
7-inch single
A. "Voyeur" – 4:01
B. "Thrill of the Grill" – 3:23

Charts

References

1982 singles
1982 songs
EMI America Records singles
Kim Carnes songs
Music videos directed by Russell Mulcahy
Song recordings produced by Val Garay
Songs written by Duane Hitchings
Songs written by Kim Carnes